Route 68 is a highway in central and southern Missouri. Its eastern (or southern) terminus is at Route 19 in Salem; its western (or northern) terminus is at U.S. Route 63 north of Rolla.  Even though it is an even- numbered route, it tends to run more north–south than east–west.

Between its northern terminus and St. James, Route 68 was Route 65 from 1922 to 1926, and has since been extended to the south.

Route description

History

Major intersections

References

068
Transportation in Dent County, Missouri
Transportation in Phelps County, Missouri
Transportation in Maries County, Missouri